Ningen (which translates as 'human') is a 2013 Japanese-Turkish drama film written and directed by Guillaume Giovanetti and Cagla Zencirci. The story is a "modern parable of a kitsune and tanuki" involving a Japanese CEO. It was screened in the Contemporary World Cinema section at the 2013 Toronto International Film Festival.

Cast
 Masahiro Yoshino
 Megumi Ayukawaa
 Xiao Mu Lee
 Masako Wajima

References

External links
 

2013 films
2013 drama films
Japanese drama films
Turkish drama films
2010s Japanese-language films
Films about mermaids
2010s Japanese films